Yafran (also Romanized as Yafrān; also known as Yafrūn) is a village in Keraj Rural District, in the Central District of Isfahan County, Isfahan Province, Iran. At the 2006 census, its population was 540, in 143 families.

References 

Populated places in Isfahan County